Ruth Woolf Jordan (November 7, 1902 – January 7, 1996) was a schoolteacher from Sedona, Arizona who developed the Jordan Historical Park and the Sedona Heritage Museum with her husband, orchardist Walter Jordan.

References

1902 births
1996 deaths
Schoolteachers from Arizona
20th-century American women educators
20th-century American educators